Castle Communications, also known as Castle Music, was a British independent record label and home video distributor founded in 1983 by Terry Shand, Cliff Dane, and Jon Beecher. Its video imprint was called Castle Vision.  The label's production ceased in 2007, and its remaining rights are now chiefly vested in BMG Rights Management. Castle also operated a subsidiary label, Essential Records.

History
Castle Communications was acquired by American music distributor Alliance Entertainment (which at the time owned Concord Records and NCircle Entertainment) in 1994 and then by Sanctuary Records Group in 2000. The label was dissolved when Sanctuary became a Universal Music Group subsidiary in 2007. Since 2013 Sanctuary has been owned by BMG Rights Management, with global distribution handled by Warner Music Group.

Starting out as a mid-price catalogue reissue specialist, with labels including The Collector Series and Dojo, it grew into the largest European owner of repertoire outside the major record companies. It purchased catalogues including Pye, Piccadilly, Bradley's, Bronze, Black Sabbath, Sugar Hill, Transatlantic, Beserkley, All Platinum and Solar. They possessed most of the Transatlantic and Trailer catalogue.

Starting in the early 1980s, they released compilations and reissued work by Fairport Convention, John Renbourn, Barbara Dickson, Steeleye Span, the Watersons, Richard Thompson, Geoff Turton and many others. They also diversified to reissue several early albums by the Fall as well as "Pink Years" and "Blue Years" albums by Tangerine Dream, and compilations by Nurse with Wound and Current 93. They have also released a comprehensive compilation featuring songs by Canadian rock band, Triumph.

In the 1980s, they were notable for releasing many heavy metal compilations albums under the series name Metal Killers. Interest in these licensed releases led them to form their own heavy metal imprint Raw Power, to sign and promote new rock acts, rather than to just license older product from other more established labels. The first signing to the Raw Power label was the NWOBHM act Hell's Belles, releasing their debut album and single in 1985. After several years, the Raw Power imprint was retired with the decline of heavy metal in the UK.

Castle Vision/Home Video 

Castle Vision was Castle Communications' home video distributor arm. It released many videotapes, including TUGS, The Raggy Dolls, Tumbledown Farm, Heathcliff, Alvin and the Chipmunks, You've Been Framed!, the Men of our Time series (documentaries about Hitler, Lenin, Gandhi and Kennedy), a documentary called Falklands War: The Untold Story, The Fugitive, Harry's Game as well as movies Bill & Ted's Excellent Adventure and Phantom of the Opera which were distributed via CBS/Fox Video

References

See also
 List of record labels

British independent record labels
Folk record labels
Rock record labels
Home video distributors
Reissue record labels
Record labels established in 1983
Record labels disestablished in 2007
Mass media companies